is a Japanese football player. She plays for Mynavi Sendai in the WE League and Japan national team.

Club career
Ikejiri was born in Kumamoto Prefecture on December 19, 1996. After graduating from Kibi International University, she joined WK League club Suwon UDC WFC in 2019.

National team career
In February 2019, Ikejiri was selected for the Japan national team for the SheBelieves Cup. She first played in this tournament on February 27, as a defensive midfielder against the United States.

National team statistics

International goals

References

External links

Japan Football Association

1996 births
Living people
Kibi International University alumni
Association football people from Kumamoto Prefecture
Japanese women's footballers
Japan women's international footballers
Women's association football forwards
WE League players